Lisa Raymond and Rennae Stubbs were the defending champions, but none competed this year.

Cara Black and Elena Likhovtseva won the title by defeating Martina Hingis and Anna Kournikova 6–4, 1–6, 6–4 in the final.

Seeds

Draw

Draw

External links
 Official Results archive (ITF)
 Official Results archive (WTA)

Southern California Open
2001 WTA Tour